Domanin  is a village in the administrative district of Gmina Dąbie, within Koło County, Greater Poland Voivodeship, in west-central Poland.

Domanin is located about 1 km south of the town of Dąbie, on the left bank of the Ner river.

References

Villages in Koło County